Sretensky (masculine), Sretenskaya (feminine), or Sretenskoye (neuter) is the name of several rural localities in Russia:
Sretenskoye, Kirov Oblast, a selo in Akhmanovsky Rural Okrug of Pizhansky District of Kirov Oblast
Sretenskoye, Perm Krai, a selo in Ilyinsky District of Perm Krai